Gowhar Kuh Rural District is a rural district (dehestan) in Nukabad District, Khash County, Sistan and Baluchestan province, Iran. At the 2006 census, its population was 9,100, in 1,887 families.  The rural district has 111 villages.

References 

Rural Districts of Sistan and Baluchestan Province
Khash County